Westbroek is a village in the Dutch province of Utrecht.

Westbroek may also refer to:

People
 Eva-Maria Westbroek (born 1970), Dutch soprano opera singer
 Henk Westbroek (born 1952), Dutch radiohost, singer, songwriter, cafe owner, and political activist
 Mario Westbroek (born 1961), Dutch sprinter who competed at the 1980 Summer Olympics
 Rochus Westbroek (born 1971), Dutch field hockey player
 Thijs Westbroek, a.k.a. Brooks (born 1995), Dutch DJ and record producer

Other
 Battle of Westbroek, fought near Westbroek in 1481
 De Brauw Blackstone Westbroek, a Dutch law firm headquartered in Amsterdam

See also